Adwick upon Dearne is a civil parish in the metropolitan borough of Doncaster, South Yorkshire, England.  The parish contains seven listed buildings that are recorded in the National Heritage List for England.  Of these, one is listed at Grade II*, the middle of the three grades, and the others are at Grade II, the lowest grade.  The parish contains the village of Adwick upon Dearne and the surrounding countryside.  The listed buildings consist of a church, a cross base in the churchyard, a dovecote, two bridges, and a farmhouse. 


Key

Buildings

References

Citations

Sources

 

Lists of listed buildings in South Yorkshire
Buildings and structures in the Metropolitan Borough of Doncaster